The 2021 Men's European Qualifier was the European qualification tournament for the 2023 Men's FIH Hockey World Cup. The tournament was held at the Sport Wales National Centre in Cardiff, Wales from 21 to 24 October 2021.

The top five teams from the 2021 EuroHockey Championship were already qualified for the 2023 Men's FIH Hockey World Cup and the top two teams from this tournament joined them.

Qualification
The bottom three teams from the 2021 EuroHockey Championship and the top 5 from the 2021 EuroHockey Championship II participated in the tournament.

Results
All times are local (UTC+1).

Bracket

Fifth place bracket

Quarter-finals

5–8th place semifinals

Semi-finals

Seventh place game

Fifth place game

Third place game

Final

Statistics

Final standings

Goalscorers

See also
2022 Women's FIH Hockey World Cup – European Qualifier

References

European Qualifier
European Qualifier
International field hockey competitions hosted by Wales
Sports competitions in Cardiff
FIH Hockey World Cup - European Qualifier
FIH Hockey World Cup - European Qualifier
2010s in Cardiff
Men's Hockey World Cup qualifiers